Nick Mathewson is an American computer scientist and co-founder of The Tor Project. He, along with Roger Dingledine, began working on onion routing shortly after they  graduated from Massachusetts Institute of Technology (MIT) in the early 2000s. He is also known by his pseudonym nickm. Mathewson and Dingledine were the focus of increased media attention after the leak of NSA's highly classified documents by Edward Snowden, and the subsequent public disclosure of the operation of XKeyscore, which targeted one of The Tor Project's onion servers along with Mixminion remailer which are both run at MIT.

Education 
Mathewson graduated from MIT in 2002, earning a Bachelor of Science degree in Computer Science. He later earned a Master of Engineering in Computer Science and Linguistics from MIT.

Works

The Tor Project 
Tor was developed by Mathewson, along with his two colleagues, under a contract from the United States Naval Research Laboratory. Mathewson is also lead developer responsible for the security, design, maintenance of the Tor protocol, along with sending out security patches.

Libevent 

He is also the primary maintainer for Libevent, an event notification library used by some prominent applications like Chrome Browser, Transmission and also Tor.

Honors 
Mathewson, along with the other two developers of the Tor Project (Roger Dingledine and Paul Syverson), were recognized in 2012, by Foreign Policy magazine as #78 in their list of the top 100 global thinkers of the year.

Selected publications

References 

Massachusetts Institute of Technology alumni
American computer scientists
Year of birth missing (living people)
Living people
Tor (anonymity network)
Free software programmers